The Government Technology Agency (GovTech) is a statutory board of the Government of Singapore, under the Prime Minister's Office. It was restructured from Infocomm Development Authority of Singapore (IMDA) in 2016, and officially legislated in Parliament on 18 August that year.

Overview
GovTech is responsible for the delivery of the Singapore government's digital services to the public. It is the agency that provides the infrastructure to support the implementation of the country's Smart Nation initiative to utilise infocomm technologies, networks and big data to create tech-enabled solutions.

The Government Chief Information Office (GCIO) is under GovTech.

From 1 May 2017, GovTech was moved from the Ministry of Communications and Information to the Prime Minister's Office (Singapore) (PMO). It is now the implementing agency of PMO's "Smart Nation and Digital Government Office" (SNDGO).

Its sub-unit Open Government Products (OGP) develops pieces of software for the government. As of 2022, Lee Hsien Loong's son Li Hongyi serves as the director of OGP.

See also
 Info-communications Media Development Authority
 Cyber Security Agency (Singapore)

References

External links
 
 Data.gov.sg

Internet in Singapore
Statutory boards of the Singapore Government
2016 establishments in Singapore
Government agencies established in 2016